Theophalus Curtis Ratliff (born April 17, 1973) is an American former professional basketball player who played 16 seasons in the National Basketball Association (NBA). Primarily a center, he was widely regarded as an excellent shot-blocker and led the league three times in blocks per game.  As of 2020, he was ranked 20th all-time in career blocks.

College career
At Wyoming, Ratliff had a successful career, finishing as the career leader in blocked shots. He accumulated 425 blocked shots in his career as a Cowboy, a record that still stands today.  Ratliff was inducted into the University of Wyoming Athletics Hall of Fame in 2005.

NBA career
Ratliff was selected with the 18th overall pick in the 1995 NBA draft by the Detroit Pistons, for whom he played 2½ seasons. During the 1997–98 season he was traded to the Philadelphia 76ers, along with Aaron McKie, in a package for Eric Montross and Jerry Stackhouse. That season, on March 22, 1998, Ratliff scored a career-high 27 points during a 108-90 loss against the Boston Celtics.

He played in Philadelphia for three seasons, and was voted Eastern Conference reserve center of the 2001 All-Star Game, but was unable to play due to injury. He was a key fixture on the 2000–01 Sixers team that would eventually make it to the NBA finals, but an injured Ratliff was dealt at the trade deadline on February 22 to the Atlanta Hawks for Dikembe Mutombo.

He missed most of the next season due to injury, but rebounded to post 262 blocks the next year with the Hawks. His best year as a pro was 2003–04, when he recorded a league-leading 307 blocked shots in total. During that season he was dealt to the Portland Trail Blazers, along with Shareef Abdur-Rahim and Dan Dickau, for Rasheed Wallace and Wesley Person. After the trade, he averaged a career-high 4.4 blocks per game to finish the season. After the 2004 season, he signed a three-year contract extension with the Blazers but was not as effective in 2004–05 and lost his starting job to Joel Przybilla midway through the schedule.

In June 2006, the Boston Celtics acquired Ratliff along with Sebastian Telfair from the Portland Trail Blazers in exchange for the draft rights of Randy Foye, power forward–center Raef LaFrentz, and point guard Dan Dickau.

In July 2007, he was traded along with Gerald Green, Ryan Gomes, Al Jefferson, Sebastian Telfair, and draft picks, to the Minnesota Timberwolves for Kevin Garnett. In February 2008 Ratliff was waived by the Timberwolves, and he rejoined the Detroit Pistons in March.

Ratliff returned to the Philadelphia 76ers for 2008–09 season.  In the offseason he was signed by the San Antonio Spurs. In February 2010, he was traded to the Charlotte Bobcats for a projected second round draft pick in 2016.

Ratliff was signed by the Los Angeles Lakers on July 22, 2010 to a one-year deal.

In December 2011, Ratliff retired from basketball.

Awards and honors
Ratliff won numerous awards during his career. The following are some of his collegiate achievements:
 First Team All-Western Athletic Conference (1994, 1995)
 Inducted into the University of Wyoming Athletics Hall of Fame (2005)

Personal life and business ventures

Ratliff played basketball at Demopolis High School in Demopolis, Alabama, and later graduated from the University of Wyoming. He created The Theo Ratliff Center in Demopolis, Alabama which is a recreation center with a basketball court.

Ratliff was the owner of the Rome Gladiators basketball team.

In 2020, Ratliff wrote and published Theo The Hero, a children’s book on how to deal with bullying.

NBA career statistics

Regular season 

|-
| align="left" | 
| align="left" | Detroit
| 75 || 2 || 17.4 || .557 || .000 || .708 || 4.0 || .2 || .2 || 1.5 || 4.5
|-
| align="left" | 
| align="left" | Detroit
| 76 || 38 || 17.0 || .531 || .000 || .698 || 3.4 || .2 || .4 || 1.5 || 5.8
|-
| align="left" | 
| align="left" | Detroit
| 24 || 12 || 24.4 || .514 || .000 || .683 || 5.0 || .6 || .5 || 2.3 || 6.5
|-
| align="left" | 
| align="left" | Philadelphia
| 58 || 55 || 32.1 || .512 || .000 || .706 || 7.3 || .7 || .7 || 3.5 || 11.2
|-
| align="left" | 
| align="left" | Philadelphia
| 50 || 50 || 32.5 || .470 || .000 || .725 || 8.1 || .6 || .9 || 3.0 || 11.2
|-
| align="left" | 
| align="left" | Philadelphia
| 57 || 56 || 31.5 || .503 || .000 || .771 || 7.6 || .6 || .6 || 3.0 || 11.9
|-
| align="left" | 
| align="left" | Philadelphia
| 50 || 50 || 36.0 || .499 || .000 || .760 || 8.3 || 1.2 || .6 ||style="background:#cfecec;"| 3.7* || 12.4
|-
| align="left" | 
| align="left" | Atlanta
| 3 || 2 || 27.3 || .500 || .000 || .545 || 5.3 || .3 || .3 || 2.7 || 8.7
|-
| align="left" | 
| align="left" | Atlanta
| 81 || 81 || 31.1 || .464 || .000 || .720 || 7.5 || .9 || .7 || style="background:#cfecec;"|3.2* || 8.7
|-
| align="left" | 
| align="left" | Atlanta
| 53 || 52 || 31.1 || .458 || .000 || .653 || 7.2 || 1.0 || .6 || 3.1 || 8.3
|-
| align="left" | 
| align="left" | Portland
| 32 || 31 || 31.8 || .540 || .000 || .629 || 7.3 || .6 || .8 ||style="background:#cfecec;"| 4.4* || 7.3
|-
| align="left" | 
| align="left" | Portland
| 63 || 45 || 27.5 || .447 || .000 || .692 || 5.3 || .5 || .4 || 2.5 || 4.8
|-
| align="left" | 
| align="left" | Portland
| 55 || 19 || 23.7 || .571 || .000 || .651 || 5.1 || .5 || .3 || 1.6 || 4.9
|-
| align="left" | 
| align="left" | Boston
| 2 || 2 || 22.0 || .333 || .000 || .750 || 3.5 || .0 || .5 || 1.5 || 2.5
|-
| align="left" | 
| align="left" | Minnesota
| 10 || 6 || 21.4 || .511 || .000 || .680 || 3.9 || .7 || .3 || 1.9 || 6.3
|-
| align="left" | 
| align="left" | Detroit
| 16 || 3 || 13.9 || .450 || .000 || .667 || 3.1 || .4 || .3 || 1.1 || 3.0
|-
| align="left" | 
| align="left" | Philadelphia
| 46 || 0 || 12.6 || .531 || .000 || .600 || 2.8 || .2 || .4 || 1.0 || 1.9
|-
| align="left" | 
| align="left" | San Antonio
| 21 || 3 || 8.7 || .444 || .000 || .500 || 1.9 || .4 || .1 || .9 || 1.6
|-
| align="left" | 
| align="left" | Charlotte
| 28 || 26 || 22.3 || .466 || .000 || .783 || 4.2 || .6 || .3 || 1.5 || 5.1
|-
| align="left" | 
| align="left" | L.A. Lakers
| 10 || 0 || 7.0 || .167 || .000 || .000 || 1.3 || .3 || .2 || .5 || .2
|- class="sortbottom"
| style="text-align:center;" colspan="2"| Career
| 810 || 533 || 25.5 || .496 || .000 || .710 || 5.7 || .6 || .5 || 2.4 || 7.2

Playoffs 

|-
| align="left" | 1996
| align="left" | Detroit
| 1 || 0 || 4.0 || .000 || .000 || .000 || .0 || .0 || .0 || .0 || .0
|-
| align="left" | 1997
| align="left" | Detroit
| 3 || 0 || 6.0 || .750 || .000 || .500 || 1.3 || .3 || .3 || 1.3 || 2.7
|-
| align="left" | 1999
| align="left" | Philadelphia
| 7 || 7 || 29.1 || .465 || .000 || .579 || 7.3 || .9 || .7 || 2.6 || 7.3
|-
| align="left" | 2000
| align="left" | Philadelphia
| 10 || 10 || 37.4 || .475 || .000 || .723 || 7.9 || .9 || 1.0 || 3.0 || 13.0
|-
| align="left" | 2008
| align="left" | Detroit
| 12 || 0 || 10.9 || .500 || .000 || .500 || 2.3 || .1 || .1 || .9 || 1.3
|-
| align="left" | 2009
| align="left" | Philadelphia
| 6 || 0 || 15.7 || .818 || .000 || .500 || 3.8 || .0 || .2 || .7 || 3.3
|-
| align="left" | 2010
| align="left" | Charlotte
| 4 || 4 || 11.8 || .375 || .000 || .500 || .8 || .3 || .5 || .0 || 1.8
|-
| align="left" | 2011
| align="left" | L.A. Lakers
| 1 || 0 || 1.0 || .000 || .000 || .000 || 1.0 || .0 || .0 || .0 || .0
|- class="sortbottom"
| style="text-align:center;" colspan="2"| Career
| 44 || 21 || 19.8 || .497 || .000 || .643 || 4.3 || .4 || .5 || 1.5 || 5.3

See also
List of National Basketball Association career blocks leaders
List of National Basketball Association annual blocks leaders
List of NCAA Division I men's basketball career blocks leaders
List of NCAA Division I men's basketball season blocks leaders

References

External links

NBA.com profile
Basketball-Reference profile

1973 births
Living people
African-American basketball players
American men's basketball players
Atlanta Hawks players
Basketball players from Alabama
Boston Celtics players
Centers (basketball)
Charlotte Bobcats players
Detroit Pistons draft picks
Detroit Pistons players
Los Angeles Lakers players
Minnesota Timberwolves players
National Basketball Association All-Stars
People from Demopolis, Alabama
Philadelphia 76ers players
Portland Trail Blazers players
Power forwards (basketball)
San Antonio Spurs players
Wyoming Cowboys basketball players
21st-century African-American sportspeople
20th-century African-American sportspeople